2012 in continental European music in geographical order. See also 2012 in music.

Scandinavia
Loreen wins the Eurovision Song Contest 2012 with Euphoria which is also a top seller across Europe and the album Heal tops the Swedish charts for one week but her other singles don't even crack the Top 10 in her own country. 
Mando Diao rise to the top with their first Swedish album Infruset, so does 60- year old veteran Tomas Ledin with the compilation 40/40: 40 År 40 Hits –
Ett Samlingsalbum 1972–2012.
Avicii 2011 single Levels wins the Swedish Grammis.
Swedish House Mafia announce that they will be breaking up, and that they would embark on One Last Tour finishing at Ultra Music Festival in March 2013.
Lukas Graham from Copenhagen occupy Denmark's album No. 1 for 8 weeks with their debut Lukas Graham, the singles ""Drunk in the Morning" and "Better Than Yourself (Criminal Mind) Part 2" also top the charts.
Danish Singer-songwriter Rasmus Seebach's second album Mer' end kærlighed reaches just like his debut 10 times Platinum, I mine øjne is a No. 1 single.
Of Monsters and Men have a rare hit for an Icelandic band, Little Talks reaches the Top 10 in several European countries, including No.1 in Ireland, and No. 1 on US Alternative Songs. The album My Head Is an Animal reaches No. 1 in Australia and Ireland and Top5 in Germany and Canada.

Netherlands
Sandra van Nieuwland's debut album "And More" becomes a No. 1 like her cover versions Keep Your Head Up and Beggin' even though she didn't win The Voice of Holland.
Holland's biggest three-day Pinkpop Festival is held at Landgraaf.

Belgium
Trip hop band Hooverphonic top the charts for the second time after a ten-year wait with the album Hooverphonic with Orchestra, so does Triggerfinger's live album Faders Up 2 - Live in Amsterdam ft their No. 1 cover version of I Follow Rivers.
The celebrated Rock Werchter sees 85,000 visitors on each of its four days. The country's second biggest Pukkelpop festival goes ahead without incident after deaths in the years before.

Germany
The veterans sell well, Udo Lindenberg stays at No. 1 with his 2011 "MTV Unplugged – Live aus dem Hotel Atlantic" and Die Toten Hosen have a charttopping album with Ballast der Republik; Tage wie diese, also Platinum in Austria and Switzerland, is only their second No. 1 single after 1996's Zehn kleine Jägermeister.
Rapper Cro, however, who sports a panda mask and has a No. 1 album with Raop and a big hit with the relaxed "Eazy", is a newcomer.
2010 Eurovision winner Lena Meyer-Landrut's third album is the first not to reach No. 1, Stardust and the eponymous single Stardust both reach second place and Gold status.
Rock am Ring and Rock im Park are the biggest local festivals, more than 80,000 attend Wacken Open Air Heavy Metal festival.

Switzerland
Veteran rockers Züri West have their seventh No. 1 album with "Göteborg". Luca Hänni who won the German talent show Deutschland sucht den Superstar achieves the same with his debut "My Name Is Luca".

France
Sexion d'Assaut top the album charts for 5 weeks and reach Diamond with L’Apogée. Charity project Les Enfoirés follow through with Le bal des Enfoirés.

Spain
Superstar Alejandro Sanz has another No. 1 album with La Música No Se Toca.
Pablo Alborán is the hottest young act, his Perdóname is No. 1 in Portugal for no less than 25 weeks and his live album En Acústico is No. 1 in Spain and Portugal, studio album Tanto also climbs to the top.

Italy
Veteran Biagio Antonacci from Milan is No. 1 for 7 weeks with "Sapessi dire no".
Sicilian project Tacabro (in Italy also known as "Romano & Sapienza feat. Rodríguez") have a hit across Europe with Tacata'.
Emma Marrone from Florence has two more No. 1 singles with "Non è l'inferno" and "Cercavo amore" and tours with her album Sarò libera. Her break-up with boyfriend Stefano De Martino fills the pages of the Italian yellow press.

Eastern Europe
Dima Bilan from Russia wins MTV Europe Music Award for Best European Act.
Sziget Festival Budapest has about 65,000 visitors on each of its six days.
Open'er Festival at the Gdynia airport remains the largest Polish open-air music and performing arts festival.

Deaths
9 January – Bridie Gallagher, Ireland's first pop singer (b. 1924)
14 February – Tonmi Lillman, Finnish drummer and producer (Lordi, Sinergy, To/Die/For, and Ajattara) (b. 1973)

External links 
 Italy
Swiss Singles, Swiss Albums
Belgian Charts
 German Charts

2012 in music